Gilbert "Gil" Koetzle was a Democratic member of the South Dakota Senate, representing the 15th district between 2001 and 2008. He also represented a House District between 1993 and 2000. He committed suicide on January 10, 2013, one day after a search of his house turned up images of child pornography in his email as well as six bags of marijuana and also associated paraphernalia.

References

External links
South Dakota Legislature - Gil Koetzle official SD Senate website

Project Vote Smart - Senator Gilbert 'Gil' Koetzle (SD) profile
Follow the Money - Gil Koetzle
2006 2004 2002 2000 campaign contributions

South Dakota state senators
1952 births
2013 deaths